Dewald Dawid Human (born 19 May 1995) is a South African rugby sevens player, currently playing with the South Africa national team. He can play as a fly-half or fullback.

Rugby career

Youth rugby : SWD Eagles

Human was born in Uniondale, South Africa. He attended and played rugby for Hoërskool Outeniqua in George, which is situated in the  catchment area. In 2011, he was called up to represent the SWD Eagles' Under-16 team at the Grant Khomo Week tournament held in Queenstown.

In 2012, he represented the SWD Eagles at the premier high schools rugby union tournament in South Africa, the Under-18 Craven Week, held in Port Elizabeth. He was the starting fly-half for his side in all three matches; in the second of those – a 33–39 defeat to against Western Province – he scored two tries and kicked a conversion for a points haul of 12 points.

He was again selected in SWD Eagles' Craven Week side for the 2013 event held in Polokwane and scored a try in his first match, a 27–34 defeat to the Golden Lions. He converted five tries in his second match against Eastern Province in a 40–14 win and delivered an even better scoring performance in their final match, scoring one try, three penalties and four conversions for a personal points tally of 22 in a 37–29 victory over the Blue Bulls. His two tries and 27 points with the boot placed him in eleventh position in the points scoring charts for the tournament.

At the conclusion of the tournament, Human was also included in a South African Schools squad. He was named on the bench for their first match of the 2013 Under-18 International Series against England, but was not used in their 19–14 victory. He started their second match against of the series against France, kicking a penalty and two conversions in a 17–13 victory. He dropped down to the bench for their final match against Wales and did not appear in their 14–13 victory.

Blue Bulls / Tuks

After high school, Human moved to Pretoria, where he joined the  academy. He was included in the  squad for the 2014 Under-19 Provincial Championship and immediately established himself as the first-choice fly-half for the team. He started nine of their twelve matches during the regular season, helping the team finish top of the log, winning nine of their matches. He scored his first (and second) try at this level in their Round Five match against trans-Jukskei rivals , also kicking eleven points to help his side to a 36–11 victory. His biggest contribution with the boot came in their Round Twelve match against , kicking four penalties and two conversions in a 50–25 victory. He started their semi-final match against the Sharks, scoring a try, a penalty and five conversions for a points haul of 18 points in a 43–20 victory, and also scored a try in the final against , but could not prevent his side losing 26–33 to the team from Cape Town. In total, Human contributed 115 points to the Blue Bulls' points total during the season, the third-most in Group A of the competition, behind Western Province's Ernst Stapelberg and the Sharks' Inny Radebe.

At the start of 2015, Human played Varsity Cup rugby with the Pretoria-based university side, . He made just five appearances, starting three of those, scoring just three points via a penalty in their match against  during the season.

South Africa Sevens / Kings

Human was contracted by the South African Rugby Union to join the South Africa Sevens Academy and was also named in an extended training squad as preparation for the 2016 Summer Olympics. However, he failed to make any appearances for the senior sevens squad during the 2015–16 Sevens World Series. On 5 May 2017, he was selected for the South Africa Sevens team to compete in the final two tournaments of the 2016–17 World Rugby Sevens Series in Paris and London.

In 2022, He was part of the South African team that won their second Commonwealth Games gold medal in Birmingham.

References

South African rugby union players
Living people
1995 births
People from George Local Municipality
Rugby union fly-halves
Rugby union fullbacks
Southern Kings players
Rugby union players from the Western Cape
Rugby sevens players at the 2022 Commonwealth Games
Commonwealth Games gold medallists for South Africa
Commonwealth Games medallists in rugby sevens
Medallists at the 2022 Commonwealth Games